Jordan is a village in Onondaga County, New York, United States. The population was 1,368 at the 2010 census. It is part of the Syracuse Metropolitan Statistical Area. It was named after the Jordan River.

Jordan is located in the northwest part of the town of Elbridge, west of Syracuse.

History 
The village bloomed with the opening of the Erie Canal in 1825. Due to the canal, Jordan became larger than Elbridge Village, farther south.

Jordan became an incorporated village in 1835.

In 1983, much of the village was included in the Jordan Village Historic District and listed on the National Register of Historic Places.

Lincoln funeral procession

Erie Canal 

When the Erie Canal first began construction on July 4, 1817, it started in Rome. Lock 51 in Jordan was built circa 1818 to 1824; the canal opened in October 1825. The Erie Canal was active until 1918, when it was closed.

Historic places and businesses 
The Jordan Lodge 386 F. & A.M., also known as the Masonic building, is located in Jordan on North Main Street. It was built in 1979. Bush Funeral Home, established in 1904, is also located on North Main Street.

Image Gallery

Geography
Jordan is located at  (43.0658, -76.4729).

The village was formerly located on the Erie Canal, which has been re-routed farther north. The New York State Thruway (Interstate 90) passes north of the village, but there is no interchange at all in the town.

Skaneateles Creek flows through the village. The Jordan Aqueduct still stands where the Erie Canal crossed Skaneateles Creek.

Jordan is situated at the junction of state routes 31 and 317.

Demographics

As of the census of 2000, there were 1,314 people, 499 households, and 336 families residing in the village. The population density was 1,136.7 people per square mile (437.4/km2). There were 542 housing units at an average density of 468.9 per square mile (180.4/km2). The racial makeup of the village was 97.34% White, 0.46% African American, 0.61% Native American, 0.53% Asian, 0.38% from other races, and 0.68% from two or more races. Hispanic or Latino of any race were 1.07% of the population.

There were 499 households, out of which 41.5% had children under the age of 18 living with them, 48.7% were married couples living together, 13.2% had a female householder with no husband present, and 32.5% were non-families. 28.5% of all households were made up of individuals, and 15.8% had someone living alone who was 65 years of age or older. The average household size was 2.63 and the average family size was 3.25.

In the village, the population was spread out, with 32.0% under the age of 18, 6.7% from 18 to 24, 28.5% from 25 to 44, 19.4% from 45 to 64, and 13.5% who were 65 years of age or older. The median age was 35 years. For every 100 females, there were 96.1 males. For every 100 females age 18 and over, there were 89.0 males.

The median income for a household in the village was $34,728, and the median income for a family was $40,234. Males had a median income of $32,583 versus $26,250 for females. The per capita income for the village was $15,844. About 6.3% of families and 8.5% of the population were below the poverty line, including 9.4% of those under age 18 and 13.0% of those age 65 or over.

Notable people
Olive Pond Amies, educator
Sheldon Peck, Folk Artist and Abolitionist

References

 Census 2010
 Village of Jordan, NY "SEX & AGE Census 2010"

External links
 Village of Jordan official website
 The Eagle Observer, weekly newspaper
 New York State Rural Water Information
 Jordan Big M Article

Villages in New York (state)
Syracuse metropolitan area
Villages in Onondaga County, New York